Roman Nikolayevich Shirokov (born 6 July 1981) is a Russian international football official and a former player.

As a player, he was described as "a deep-lying midfielder with an aptitude for getting forward to score goals".

Club career

Early career
Before signing for Zenit, Shirokov played for FC Khimki, Rubin Kazan, Saturn Moscow Oblast, FC Vidnoye, FC Istra, Torpedo-ZIL Moscow and CSKA Moscow's farm club.

Zenit
Shirokov started his first season for Zenit as central back, as then-head coach Dick Advocaat was forced to fill the gaps left in the centre of defence after the departure of Martin Škrtel to Liverpool and severe injury to Nicolas Lombaerts.

Spartak Moscow
On 18 July 2014 it was announced that Shirokov signed a contract with Spartak Moscow as a free agent. After a long recovery from an injury he made his debut for Spartak on 26 October 2014 in a game against FC Lokomotiv Moscow, scoring a late equalizer in a 1–1 game. On 13 January 2015, he was loaned back to FC Krasnodar.

Shirokov was benched during the 2015–16 season, in order to not pay him the amount due to him by contract if he plays a certain number of minutes. The President of the RFU, Vitaly Mutko, commented: "He's one of the best footballers in our country. I don't understand why he's not playing. If it's due to the contract clause that's just dishonest." On 23 January 2016, his Spartak contract was dissolved by mutual consent.

CSKA Moscow
On 9 February 2016, he returned to his first club, PFC CSKA Moscow, signing a contract until the end of the 2015–16 season with an extension option. His contract was not extended at the end of the season.

International career

He was called up for the Euro 2008 and started in the opening group match against Spain, being deployed in the centre of defence as then-manager of Russia Guus Hiddink decided to follow the footsteps of his compatriot Advocaat, thus relegating experienced Sergey Ignashevich to the bench. This move proved unsuccessful as Russia were beaten 1–4 with Shirokov at fault on the number of occasions, including Spaniards' first and third goals. After the game Hiddink slammed his team's performance in defence and revamped the squad, leaving Shirokov out of the first team for the rest of the tournament.

After a string of assuring performances in the centre of Zenit's midfield, he was called back to the national team in 2010 for a friendly against Bulgaria. 
He was confirmed for the finalized UEFA Euro 2012 squad on 25 May 2012. He scored the second goal of Russia's opening game of this tournament against the Czech Republic in a 4–1 win.

On 2 June 2014, he was included in Russia's 2014 FIFA World Cup squad. He was excluded from the squad on 6 June due to injury.

Post-playing
On 5 June 2018, he was appointed by FC Dynamo Moscow as the deputy general director in charge of sports. He left Dynamo on 1 May 2019.

During an amateur game in August 2020 he attacked a referee with punches to his face and kicks once he had knocked the referee to the ground, causing the referee to be hospitalized for three weeks. He was reported to the police for assault. He was tried and found guilty by a Moscow court. He was sentenced to 100 hours of community service. He was also suspended by his employer, Match TV.

On 2 March 2022, Shirokov supported the Russian invasion of Ukraine, adding that those Russians, who are ashamed of the war, are welcome to leave the country.

Honors

Club
Zenit
 UEFA Cup (1): 2007–08
 UEFA Super Cup (1): 2008
Russian Premier League (2):2008, 2011–12
Russian Cup (1): 2009-10
Russian Super Cup (2): 2008, 2011

CSKA
Russian Premier League (1): 2015-16

International
Russia
UEFA European Football Championship: 2008 bronze medalist

Individual
 List of 33 top players of the Russian league: 2013/14 (best central midfielder).

Career statistics

Club

International goals

References

External links
 Profile at the official FC Zenit St. Petersburg website 
 
 
 Guardian Profile

1981 births
Living people
People from Dedovsk
Association football midfielders
Russian footballers
Russia international footballers
FC Moscow players
FC Rubin Kazan players
FC Saturn Ramenskoye players
FC Krasnodar players
UEFA Euro 2008 players
UEFA Euro 2012 players
UEFA Euro 2016 players
Russian Premier League players
FC Zenit Saint Petersburg players
UEFA Cup winning players
FC Khimki players
FC Spartak Moscow players
PFC CSKA Moscow players
Sportspeople from Moscow Oblast
Sports controversies